Louis II (25 October 1330, Male – 30 January 1384, Lille), also known as Louis of Male, a member of the House of Dampierre, was Count of Flanders, Nevers and Rethel from 1346 as well as Count of Artois and Burgundy from 1382 until his death.

Family
Louis was the son of Count Louis I of Flanders, and Countess Margaret I of Burgundy, daughter of King Philip V of France. He was baptised by Bishop Pierre Roger (later Pope Clement VI). His father arranged his marriage with Margaret, daughter of Duke John III of Brabant, in the course of the rapprochement to the Imperial Duchy of Brabant. They had a daughter, Countess Margaret III of Flanders (1348–1405). Louis also had several illegitimate sons, three of whom were killed at the Battle of Nicopolis.

Rule
When his father was killed at the Battle of Crécy against the troops of King Edward III of England in 1346, he inherited the French counties of Flanders, Nevers, and Rethel. In the Anglo-French conflict, the Flanders guilds, depending on the English wool trade, forced Louis to recognize King Edward III as his overlord and arranged an engagement to the daughter of the English king, Isabella. Louis managed to avoid this by fleeing to the court of King Philip VI of France. In 1347 he married Margaret of Brabant, which sparked a revolt in Ghent. Nevertheless, while the Black Death devastated the county and after Louis came to terms with the English king in 1349 he could return to Flanders to succeed his father.

In 1350 Louis gained credence by openly refusing to pay homage to the newly ascended King John II of France. When his father-in-law John III died without male heirs in 1355, he moved to claim the Duchy of Brabant, but was unable to wrest it from his sister-in-law Joanna. Though Louis managed to defeat the Brabantian forces in the Battle of Scheut near Anderlecht (17 August 1356) and capture the cities of Mechelen, Brussels, Antwerp, and Leuven, he was unable to prevail against Joanna, backed by her husband Duke Wenceslaus I of Luxembourg and his mighty brother Emperor Charles IV. By the 1357 Peace of Ath he at least gained the rule over the small Lordship of Mechelen and the thriving city of Antwerp.

Louis tried to govern as a realpolitiker and continued a policy of neutrality, which kept him in favor with both France and England during the continued conflicts of the Hundred Years' War, initiating a period of stability and relative affluence in Flanders. With regards to his internal policy, his main aim was to prevent the formation of a broad coalition against him, as happened against his father. Except for his last years, he was successful in preventing this.

In 1357 Louis II had his seven-year-old daughter Margaret marry the minor Duke Philip I of Burgundy. Philip died from plague four years later. As heir presumptive to her father's territories, she was a highly coveted bride courted by both Edmund of Langley, son of King Edward III of England, and Philip the Bold, son of King John II of France and the new duke of Burgundy since 1363. After several years of tough bargaining, Count Louis II gave his consent to Philip and his brother King Charles V of France. In return he received the lordships of Romance Flanders (Lille, Douai, Orchies) and a payment of 200,000 livre tournois. The marriage of Margaret and Philip was celebrated at the church of Saint Bavo's Abbey in Ghent on 19 June 1369.

Though a capable ruler, Louis' lavish lifestyle burdened his county's finances and caused increasing disturbances. However, even in his latter years he managed to get the support of the Bruges citizens against revolting Ghent. The latter years of his rule were nevertheless marked by civil strife. In 1379, he obtained aid from his son-in-law, Philip the Bold, to put down another Ghent revolt. The Flemings again rose in 1382 under Philip van Artevelde and expelled Count Louis from Flanders after the Battle of Beverhoutsveld; however, the influence of Philip the Bold procured a French army to relieve him, and the Flemings were decisively defeated at the Battle of Roosebeke. The citizens of Ghent continued to resist (with English aid) until after his death in 1384. His mother, Margaret, had died two years previously, leaving him the County of Artois and the Free County of Burgundy (Franche-Comté).

References

Sources

1330 births
1384 deaths
House of Dampierre
Louis 2
Counts of Nevers
Counts of Rethel
Counts of Artois
Counts of Burgundy
14th-century peers of France
14th-century people from the county of Flanders